Christopher Charles Jacobs (born September 25, 1964) is an American former competition swimmer, two-time Olympic champion, and former world record-holder.

Early life and education 
Jacobs was born in Livingston, New Jersey, and attended Newark Academy. He was a member of the Texas Longhorns swimming and diving team. Jacobs suffered from shoulder pain and struggled with drug and alcohol addiction as a college student and dropped out during his junior year. After completing a rehabilitation program in New Jersey, he returned to the University of Texas and resumed his swimming career.

Career 
Jacobs won two gold medals and a silver while representing the United States at the 1988 Summer Olympics in Seoul, South Korea. He received his first gold medal as the lead swimmer for the winning U.S. team in the men's 4×100-meter freestyle relay, together with teammates Troy Dalbey, Tom Jager and Matt Biondi. The four Americans set a new world record of 3:16.53 in the event final. He then won another gold medal swimming the anchor freestyle leg of the men's 4×100-meter medley relay for the first-place U.S. team of David Berkoff (backstroke), Richard Schroeder (breaststroke), and Matt Biondi (butterfly). Jacobs and the medley relay team set another new world record of 3:36.93. Individually, he received a silver medal for his second-place performance in the men's 100-meter freestyle event, finishing in 49.08 seconds.

See also
 List of Olympic medalists in swimming (men)
 List of University of Texas at Austin alumni
 World record progression 4 × 100 metres freestyle relay
 World record progression 4 × 100 metres medley relay

References

External links
 

1964 births
Living people
American male freestyle swimmers
World record setters in swimming
Olympic gold medalists for the United States in swimming
Olympic silver medalists for the United States in swimming
Swimmers at the 1988 Summer Olympics
Texas Longhorns men's swimmers
Place of birth missing (living people)
Medalists at the 1988 Summer Olympics

People from Livingston, New Jersey
Newark Academy alumni
Texas Longhorns swimming and diving